Miles for Men is a UK charity which hosts male only fun runs around the country to raise funds for cancer charities. They have already raised over £84,500.

Races

Hartlepool
The very first Miles for Men race was a 5k run in Hartlepool in summer 2012. Around 1,000 runners took part raising £40,106.69 versus the original target of £7,000.
The second Hartlepool race took place in July 2013. It was started by comedian Roy 'Chubby' Brown.
The third Hartlepool race will be a 5k run on July 27, 2014 with 2,000 places for runners. It will start and end at The Domes in Seaton Carew.

Gateshead

Liverpool

Newcastle
The first Newcastle race was a 5k run at Exhibition Park, Newcastle on November 3, 2013. Around 250 runners took part including eleven Northumbria Police officers in full riot gear - including helmet, shield and elbow and shin guards - and five men from Speedflex Fitness carrying a fridge.

Sunderland
The first Sunderland race will take place on August 3, 2014 in Herrington Country Park. The race director is  Joanne Makepeace.

References

Cancer fundraisers
Charities based in County Durham
Charities based in England
Organisations based in the Borough of Hartlepool
Organizations established in 2012
Sex segregation
2012 establishments in England